The unicameral Assembly of the Union of the Comoros is the country's legislative body. It was established in 2004.

Legislative history
The Comorian legislative body, Chamber of Deputies, was established in 1961. It was reconstituted as National Assembly in July 1975. It was followed by the Federal Assembly, which had 33-43 members before year 2004. The name Assembly of the Union was taken into use in 2004. Since 2020, it has had 24 members instead of 33.

Presidents of the Chamber of Deputies

Presidents of the Assembly

See also
Assemblies of the Autonomous Islands of the Comoros
Assembly of the Autonomous Island of Anjouan
Assembly of the Autonomous Island of Grande Comore
Assembly of the Autonomous Island of Mohéli
Legislative Branch
History of Comoros
List of national legislatures
Politics of the Comoros

References

External links

Politics of the Comoros
Political organizations based in the Comoros
Government of the Comoros
Comoros
Comoros
2004 establishments in the Comoros